Anaptychia is a genus of lichenized fungi in the family Physciaceae.

Species
, Species Fungorum accepts 5 species of Anaptychia.

Anaptychia bryorum 
Anaptychia ciliaris 
Anaptychia isidiza 
Anaptychia palmulata 
Anaptychia runcinata

References

Caliciales
Lichen genera
Caliciales genera
Taxa described in 1848
Taxa named by Gustav Wilhelm Körber